Hoche may refer to:

People
 Alfred Hoche (1865–1943), German psychiatrist
 Lazare Hoche (1768–1797), French general
 Richard Hoche (1834–1906), German classical scholar and head teacher

Other
 Hoche, a Paris Métro station
 , a French Navy battleship in service from 1890 to 1908
 Lycée Hoche, a secondary school in Versailles, France